Passau is an electoral constituency (German: Wahlkreis) represented in the Bundestag. It elects one member via first-past-the-post voting. Under the current constituency numbering system, it is designated as constituency 229. It is located in southeastern Bavaria, comprising the city of Passau and most of the Landkreis Passau district.

Passau was created for the inaugural 1949 federal election. Since 2005, it has been represented by Andreas Scheuer of the Christian Social Union (CSU).

Geography
Passau is located in southeastern Bavaria. As of the 2021 federal election, it comprises the independent city of Passau and the entirety of the Landkreis Passau district excluding the municipalities of Aicha vorm Wald, Eging am See, Fürstenstein, and Hofkirchen.

History
Passau was created in 1949. In the 1949 election, it was Bavaria constituency 15 in the numbering system. In the 1953 through 1961 elections, it was number 210. In the 1965 through 1998 elections, it was number 215. In the 2002 and 2005 elections, it was number 230. Since the 2009 election, it has been number 229.

Originally, the constituency comprised the independent city of Passau and the districts of Landkreis Passau, Wegscheid, and Wolfstein. In the 1976 through 1972 elections, it also contained the Vilshofen district. In the 1976 through 2013 elections, it comprised the city of Passau and the Landkreis Passau district. It acquired its current borders in the 2017 election.

Members
The constituency has been held continuously by the Christian Social Union (CSU) since its creation. It was first represented by Fritz Schäffer from 1949 to 1961, followed by August Ramminger for one term. Franz Xaver Unertl served two terms from 1965 to 1972, as did Karl Fuchs from 1972 to 1980. Klaus Rose was then representative from 1980 to 2005, a total of seven consecutive terms. Andreas Scheuer was elected in 2005, and re-elected in 2009, 2013, 2017, and 2021.

Election results

2021 election

2017 election

2013 election

2009 election

References

Federal electoral districts in Bavaria
1949 establishments in West Germany
Constituencies established in 1949
Passau
Passau (district)